Ruth Barrett (born 1976) is a British film score composer. Her film score credits include Harry Brown, Twenty8k, and City of Tiny Lights. Her television score credits include The Sister, Bloodlands, Bodyguard, The Durrells, Collateral, Legacy, Law & Order: Organized Crime, and Victoria. For her work on Victoria, Barrett was nominated for a Primetime Emmy Award for Outstanding Music Composition for a Series.

Early life and career 
Barrett was born in Roehampton, London in 1976. She became interested in film and television music at a very young age while watching 1980s reruns of 1970s American television shows. She cites 1978s The Incredible Hulk, Queen's 1980 Flash Gordon Soundtrack, and a number of commercials broadcast throughout the 1980s as childhood inspirations that piqued her interest in music.

In her early teens she began improvising compositions around classical pieces with piano teacher and early mentor Nigel Crouch.

Ruth went on to study music at Cambridge University, and then music composition at the Royal Academy of Music in London.

She broke into the television industry composing for advertising pitches. Her first full time role was in post-production for ITV, which allowed her to build key relationships with producers and directors, while gaining practical experience composing for documentaries. Barrett also met her future husband, "sound engineer, electronic music aficionado, composer and synth super-geek", Ruskin Williamson while working there.

After leaving ITV, she freelanced at Strongroom Studios where she began working with her future mentor and collaborator Martin Phipps. This allowed her to further her industry experience, develop her contacts, and led directly a commission for her first drama score.

Works

Film

Television

Awards and nominations 
Primetime Emmy Award

References

External links

Ruth Barrett on iTunes
Ruth Barrett on Spotify

British film score composers
British women pianists
Living people
1976 births
21st-century pianists
21st-century women pianists